Zibirkhali is a rural locality (a selo) in Godoberinsky Selsoviet, Botlikhsky District, Republic of Dagestan, Russia. The population was 67 as of 2010.

Geography
Shoroda is the nearest rural locality.

References

rural localities in Botlikhsky District